Cucinotta is an Italian surname. Notable people with the surname include:

Annalisa Cucinotta (born 1986), Italian cyclist
Claudio Cucinotta (born 1982), Italian cyclist
Franco Cucinotta (born 1952), Italian footballer
Letterio Cucinotta, Italian racing driver
Maria Grazia Cucinotta (born 1968), Italian actress

Italian-language surnames